Rodeo is a Canadian drama film, directed by Joëlle Desjardins Paquette and released in 2022. The film stars Maxime Le Flaguais as Serge, a truck driver who takes his young daughter Lily (Lilou Roy-Lanouette) on a cross-Canada road trip to attend a truck rodeo in Alberta, against the context of a dispute with his ex-wife (Whitney Lafleur) over custody of her. 

The film went into production in August 2021. Although not directly based on their real lives, the film was inspired in part by Desjardins Paquette's father, a professional truck mechanic with Kenworth's operations in Montreal.

The film premiered on November 8, 2022 at the Cinemania film festival. It later screened in the Borsos Competition at the 2022 Whistler Film Festival. Commercial release is slated for early 2023.

Awards
At Whistler, Desjardins Paquette won the award for Best Director of a Borsos Competition Film and Roy-Lanouette received an honourable mention for Best Performance in a Borsos Competition Film. It was also named the winner of the EDA Award for Best Female-Directed Feature Film by the Alliance of Women Film Journalists.

The film received two nominations at the 11th Canadian Screen Awards in 2023, for Best Lead Performance in a Film (Le Flaguais) and the John Dunning Best First Feature Award.

References

2022 films
2020s French-language films
French-language Canadian films
Films set in Quebec
Films shot in Quebec
Canadian drama films
2022 drama films
2020s Canadian films
Quebec films
2022 directorial debut films